Pluem Pongpisal (born 19 July 1997) is a Thai actor. He is known for his support roles as Kevin in GMMTV's U-Prince Series (2016), Rain in Dark Blue Kiss (2019) and Phuak in 2gether: The Series (2020).

Early life and education
Pluem was born in Bangkok, Thailand. He completed his secondary education in Wat Pra Sri Mahadhat Secondary Demonstration School of  where he had the opportunity to become an international exchange student in the United States through the AFS intercultural program. He graduated from the Faculty of Architecture in Chulalongkorn University.

In his first year as an architecture student, he became part of Chulalongkorn University's Generation 8 that represented the school in the 71st Chula–Thammasat Traditional Football Match.

Filmography

Television

Awards and nominations

References

External links 
 
 
 

1997 births
Living people
Pluem Pongpisal
Pluem Pongpisal
Pluem Pongpisal
Pluem Pongpisal
Pluem Pongpisal